Sternbergia pulchella is a bulbous flowering plant in the family Amaryllidaceae, subfamily Amaryllidoideae. It has yellow flowers which appear in autumn. The species is native to Syria and Lebanon.

References

Amaryllidoideae
Plants described in 1859
Flora of Lebanon and Syria
Taxa named by Pierre Edmond Boissier